Macedonia participated in the Junior Eurovision Song Contest 2008, held at the Spyros Kyprianou Athletic Center in Cyprus.

Before Junior Eurovision

Dečja pesna Eurovizije 
The final took place on 26 September 2008, hosted by Gorast Cvetkovski and Ivona Bogoevska. Twelve songs competed and the winner was be decided by a combination of votes from a jury panel (50%) and televoting (50%).

At Junior Eurovision
On 14 October 2008 the running order for Junior Eurovision took place, and the Macedonian song was given the spot to perform fourteenth. The song placed in 5th position with 93 points, which is the country's best result to date. The entry also received points from every country, the most being ten points from Romania.

Voting

Notes

References 

Macedonia
2008
Junior Eurovision Song Contest